Hyphedyle is a monotypic moth genus in the family Geometridae described by Warren in 1894. Its only species, Hyphedyle rubedinaria, was first described by Francis Walker in 1862. It was found in Honduras.

References

Geometridae
Monotypic moth genera